Makokha is a surname most common among members of the Luhya tribe= who are from Western part of Kenya. The name Makokha literally means rubbish and among the Luhya community, it was given to a child who was born to parents who had lost previous kids. Notable people with the surname include:

Gaudencia Makokha (born 1992), Kenyan volleyball player
Jacqueline Makokha (born 1974), Kenyan volleyball player

Surnames of Kenyan origin